The 42nd Writers Guild of America Awards honored the best television, and film writers of 1989. Winners were announced on March 18, 1990.

Winners and nominees

Film 
Winners are listed first highlighted in boldface.

Television

Documentary

Special awards

References

External links 

 WGA.org

1989
W
1989 in American cinema
1989 in American television